Darab (also Romanized as Darāb and Dar-e Āb) is a village in Hotkan Rural District, in the Central District of Zarand County, Kerman Province, Iran. At the 2006 census, its population was 11, in 5 families.

References 

Populated places in Zarand County